Philip Nobel is an architect, architectural critic, and author who has written about architecture at the New York Times, Curbed, Metropolis, Artforum, Architectural Digest and other publications. He discussed disposable diaper design on Public Radio International. He lives in Brooklyn and is divorced with children.

A Kirkus Reviews writeup described his book Sixteen Acres about redevelopment efforts at the World Trade Center site known as Ground Zero as "unsparingly showing New York City’s power brokers taking a nation-bending hole in the ground and mixing into it a witch’s brew of ego, politics, greed, and amnesia".

Nobel has stated that protest and organizing have moved online. He stated malls are becoming a place of civic engagement and training grounds for future urbanism.

Bibliography
Sixteen Acres : Architecture and the Outrageous Struggle for the Future of Ground Zero (2005), about the redevelopment of Ground Zero, the site of the World Trade Center
New New York (2011), essay accompanying photographs by Jake Rajs.
The Future of the Skyscraper : SOM Thinkers Series, 2015 Edition, one of several authors
SHoP, introduction

References

External links
Interview with Nobel and Greg Pasquarelli
Article by Nobel and a photo of him at Designobserver.com

21st-century American architects
20th-century American architects
American architecture writers
Year of birth missing (living people)
Living people